Emmet Francis Byrne (December 6, 1896 – September 25, 1974) was an American politician. He was a U.S. Representative from the third district of Illinois. He served one term, 1957–59, as a Republican before being defeated in the 1958 election by Democrat William T. Murphy. Byrne voted in favor of the Civil Rights Act of 1957.

Biography
He was born in Chicago, Illinois on December 6, 1896.  He was an alumnus of Loyola University Chicago and DePaul University College of Law. He died on September 25, 1974.

References

External links
  Retrieved on 2009-01-24

1896 births
1974 deaths
Politicians from Chicago
American military personnel of World War I
Loyola University Chicago alumni
DePaul University College of Law alumni
Republican Party members of the United States House of Representatives from Illinois
20th-century American politicians